The Fitzwilliam Virginal Book is a primary source of keyboard music from the late Elizabethan and early Jacobean periods in England, i.e., the late Renaissance and very early Baroque. It takes its name from Viscount Fitzwilliam who bequeathed this manuscript collection to Cambridge University in 1816. It is now housed in the Fitzwilliam Museum at Cambridge.
The word virginals does not necessarily denote any specific instrument and might refer to anything with a keyboard.

History
It was given no title by its copyist and the ownership of the manuscript before the eighteenth century is unclear.
At the time The Fitzwilliam Virginal Book was put together most collections of keyboard music were compiled by performers and teachers: other examples include Will Forster's Virginal Book, Clement Matchett's Virginal Book, and Anne Cromwell's Virginal Book. It is possible that the complexities of typesetting music precluded the printing of much keyboard music during the late Renaissance and it was not until the advent of engraving music plates that pieces for keyboard were published. The first known example of this is  Parthenia, which was published in c. 1612.

The FVB was once given the nomenclature of Queen Elizabeth's Virginal Book, although the title cannot be correct since much of its contents were written after her death in 1603. 
Another hypothesis, which still has supporters, is that it belonged to Francis Tregian the Younger, a recusant and amateur musician. It has been argued that Tregian may have copied the entire collection while imprisoned in the period leading up to his death in 1614. The nature of Tregian's contribution to the book has been disputed. Although other scholarship suggested that, as compiler, it is unlikely that Tregian was imprisoned long enough to undertake the copying involved, a closer inspection of the manuscript reveals two layers of copying, of which nos. 1-95 pieces form the first. This layer might have been done at any time previous to Tregian's 1612 incarceration.

The manuscript includes music dating from approximately 1562 to 1612 by John Bull, William Byrd, Orlando Gibbons, Giles Farnaby (51 of whose 52 known pieces are included), Thomas Tallis.  and Martin Peerson. Continental composers are also represented by the English composer in exile Peter Philips, whose music is largely arrangements of sacred music, madrigals and chansons. Other foreign composers are represented by, among others, Jan Pieterszoon Sweelinck, the elusive Jehan Oystermayre and Giovanni Picchi. There are 298 pieces which includes the eighth variation of 'Treg. Ground' (also Hugh Ashton's Ground in My Ladye Nevells Booke) as a separate piece. It is found under a flap on which has written no. 276, 'Pescodd Time' and it is assumed that Tregian either did not recognise the variation or thought it worthy of inclusion; as it happens, it is incomplete. As with many keyboard manuscripts of the time, the pieces were not written for a specific instrument, and most sound happily on all contemporary keyboard instruments, including virginals, harpsichord, clavichord and chamber organ. Many of the pieces in the book are short, and many of them are character pieces with droll and memorable titles, including  "Put Up Thy Dagger, Jemy", "The New Sa-Hoo", and "Quodlings Delight" by Giles Farnaby; "Nobody's Gigge", by Richard Farnaby; "Pakington's Pownde" and "The Irishe Dumpe" (anonymous); "The Ghost" and "The Earle of Oxford's Marche" by William Byrd; "Worster Braules" by Thomas Tomkins; and the famous "Lachrymae Pavan" by John Dowland, as arranged by Giles Farnaby and by William Byrd.

In 1899, Breitkopf & Härtel published an edition in two volumes (the Maitland Squire edition, see the Sources below) with only a basic critical commentary, which has been reprinted by Dover Publications and is available inexpensively. A microfilm facsimile of the manuscript is included in The music collections of the Cambridge libraries (Woodbridge, Conn. : Research Publications, 1991). Musica Britannica is preparing a volume dedicated to the "Keyboard Music from Fitzwilliam Manuscripts" . A new three-volume edition was published by Lyrebird Music in 2020, edited by renowned English music scholars Jon Baxendale and Francis Knights.

Richard Strauss used several selections from the Fitzwilliam Virginal Book in his 1935 opera, Die schweigsame Frau, and cited them accordingly at their appearances in the work. They appear at ritualized moments in the action to provide commentary and atmosphere in the Act 2 marriage scene (No. XIV and No. XC) and in the Act 3 courtroom scene (No. XXXVII).

The first recording of selections from the anthology was made by Joseph Payne in 1964. It was issued by Vox Box (i.e. Vox Records) as a three-LP boxed set and features Payne performing three album sides on harpsichord (a modern Eric Herz instrument) and three sides on organ.  Generally the more moderately paced and sustained pieces are performed on the organ.

The pieces in the book

(For each composer, the pieces follow the order in which they appear in the manuscript)

Anonymous

 Alman
 Barafostus' Dreame
 Muscadin
 Alman
 Galiarda
 Praeludium, El. Kidermisters (possibly a work of John Bull)
 Praeludium
 The Irishe Hoe-Hoane
 Veni
 Heavene and Erthe
 [Exercise]
 Praeludium
 Praeludium
 Why Aske Yow
 [deest owing to an error in numbering]
 Pakingtons Pownde (possibly Benjamin Cosyn)
 The Irish Dompe
 Watkins Ale
 Can Shee
 A Toye
 An Almain
 Corranto
 Alman
 Corranto
 Corranto
 Corranto
 Daunce
 Praeludium
 Martin Sayd to his Man
 Coranto
 Corranto
 Corranto
 Corranto
 Corranto
 Alman
 Nowels Galliarde
 The Kynges Morisco
 Alman
 A Toye
 Corranto
 Ladye Riche
 Corranto
 A Toye
 Allemanda
 Dalling Alman

Doctor John Bull

 Walsingham
 Galliarda to my Lorde Lumlyes Pavan
 Pavana
 Galiarda
 The Quadran Pavan
 Variation of the Quadran Pavan
 Galiard to the Quadran Pavan
 Pavan
 Galiard to the Pavan
 Sainte Thomas Wake
 Praeludium
 Fantasia
 Praeludium
 Gloria tibi trinitas
 Salvator Mundi
 Galliarda
 Variatio
 Galliarda to the Pavan
 In Nomine
 Christe Redemptor
 The Kynges Hunt
 Pavana
 Galiarda
 Dr Bulls Juell
 The Spanyshe Paven
 The Duke of Brunswykes Alman
 Pypers Galiarde
 Variatio ejusdem
 Praeludium
 Galiarda
 Galiarda
 A Gigge, Doctor Bulls My selfe
 A Gigge
 Praeludium
 Ut, re, mi, fa, sol, la
 The Duchesse of Brunswykes Toye
 Miserere in three partes

Ferdinando Richardson

 Pavana
 Variatio
 Galiarda
 Variation
 Pavane
 Variatio
 Galiarda
 Variatio

Giles Farnaby

 Pavana (Robert Johnson set by Giles Farnaby)
 The K[ing's] Hunt
 Spagnioletta
 For tow virginals
 Daphne
 Pawles Wharfe
 Quodlings Deligte
 Putte upp thy Dagger, Jemy
 Bony sweete Robin
 Fantasia
 Wooddy Cocke
 Rosasolis
 Alman (Robert Johnson set by Giles Farnaby)
 The Nuwe Sa-Hoo
 Giles Farnabyes Dreame
 His Rest
 His Humoure
 A Maske
 A Maske
 Fantasia
 A Maske
 Fantasia
 Loth to departe
 Fantasia
 Fantasia
 Ay me, poore Heart
 Fantasia
 Walter Erles Pavan
 The L. Zouches Maske
 Grownde
 Upp T[ails] all
 Tower Hill
 Praeludium
 A Gigge
 Galliarda
 A Toye
 Farnabyes Conceite
 Telle Mee, Daphne
 Mal Sims
 Rosseters Galiarde
 The Flatt Pavan
 Why aske yow
 Farmers Pavan
 The Olde Spagnoletta
 Meridian Alman
 Fantasia

John Munday
 Fantasia
 Fantasia, Faire Wether, etc.
 Robin
 Go from my window
 Mundays Joye

Peter Philips

 Tirsi, di Luca Marenzio. Ia. Parte intavolata di Pietro Phillipi.
 Freno
 Cosi morirò
 Fece da voi
 Pavana Pagget
 Galiarda
 Passamezzo Pavana
 Galiarda passamezzo
 Chi fara fede al Cielo, di Alessandro Striggio
 Bon Jour mon Cueur, di Orlando di Lasso
 Pavana Dolorosa, Treg[ian set by]
 Galiarda Dolorosa
 Amarilli, di Julio Romano (Giulio Caccini)
 Margott laborez
 Fantasia (Si me tenez, Thomas Crecquillon).
 Pavana
 Le Rossignuol, (Lasso set by)
 Galliardo
 Fantasia

Thomas Morley
 Goe from my window
 Nancie
 Fantasia
 Alman
 La Volta (Set by William Byrd)
 Pavana
 Galiarda

Thomas Tomkins
 Pavana
 A Grownde
 Barafostus' Dreame
 The Hunting Galliard
 Worster Braules

William Byrd
BK numbers refer to Musica Britannica: William Byrd Keyboard Music, ed. Alan Brown (London: Stainer & Bell, 2 vols, 1969/71)

8.  Fantasia, BK63
10. Jhon come kisse me nowe, BK81
24. Praeludium, BK24
52. Fantasia, BK13
56. Passamezzo Pavana, BK2a
57. Galliardas Passamezzo, BK2b
58. The Carmans Whistle, BK36 (also catalogued in My Ladye Nevells Booke)
59. The Huntes upp, BK40 (also catalogued in My Ladye Nevells Booke)
61. Treg[ian's] Grownde, BK20
61(sic.) Monsieurs Alman (I), BK87
62. Variatio, BK88
63. [Monsieur's] Alman [III], BK44
64. Sellengers Rownde, BK84 (also catalogued in My Ladye Nevells Booke)
65. Fortune, BK6
66. O Mistris Myne, BK83
67. Will Yow Walke the Woods soe Wylde, BK85 (also catalogued in My Ladye Nevells Booke)
68. Have With Yow to Walsingame, BK8 (also catalogued in My Ladye Nevells Booke)
69. The Bells, BK38
91. Pavana, Bray, BK59a
92. Galiarda, BK59b
93. Pavana, Ph. Tr., BK60a
94. Galiarda, BK60b
100. Praeludium to the Fancie, BK12
101. Ut, Re, Mi, Fa, Sol, La, BK64 (also catalogued in My Ladye Nevells Booke)
102. Ut, Re, Mi, BK65
103. Fantasia
104. All in a Garden Grine, BK56
121. Pavana Lachrymae, BK54 (by John Dowland, set by William Byrd)
122. Galiarda, BK55 (by James Harding, set by Byrd)
126. The Maydens Songe, BK82
133. The Quadran Pavian, BK70a
134. Galiarde to the Quadran Pavian, BK70b
150. Malt's come downe, BK107 (doubtful attribution)
155. La Volta, BK91
156. An Almane, BK89
157. Wolsey's Wylde, BK37
158. Callino Casturame, BK35
159. La Volta L. Morley, BK90
160. Rowland (Lord Willobies welcome home), BK7 (also catalogued in My Ladye Nevells Booke)
162. The Goste, BK78
163. Alman, BK11
164. Galliard, BK53
165. Pavana, BK4a
166. Galiarda, BK4b
167. [The first] Pavana, BK29a (also catalogued in My Ladye Nevells Booke)
168. Galiarda, BK29b (also catalogued in My Ladye Nevells Booke)
172. The Queene's Alman, BK10
173. A Medley, BK111 (attribution doubtful)
174. Pavana
175. Galliarda
176. Miserere [Clarifica me pater] in three partes, BK48
177. Miserere [Clarifica me pater] in fore partes, BK49
181. A Gigg, 'F.Tr.', BK22
191. Sir Jhon Grayes Galliarde, BK104 (doubtful attribution)
216. Gipsies Rownde, BK80
218. [The French] Coranto, BK21a
241. Corranto, BK45
252. [The third] Pavana, BK14a (also catalogued in My Ladye Nevells Booke)
253. Galiarda, BK14b (also catalogued in My Ladye Nevells Booke)
254. Pavana, BK52a
255. Galiarda, BK52b
256. Pavana, BK101 (doubtful attribution)
257. [The second] Pavana Fant[], BK71a (also catalogued in My Ladye Nevells Booke)
258. Galiarda, BK71b (also catalogued in My Ladye Nevells Booke)
259 The Earle of Oxford's Marche [The march before the Battell], BK93 (also catalogued in My Ladye Nevells Booke)
261. Fantasia, BK62
275. Pavana, Canon 2 in 1, 
276. Pescodd Tyme [The Hunt's Up], BK40
277. Pavana deligte (Edward Johnson, set by William Byrd), BK5a
278. Galiarda (Edward Johnson, set by William Byrd), BK5b
294. Ladye Montegles Pavan, BK75

The Other Pieces

 Pavana - M. S.
 The Woods so Wilde - Orlando Gibbons
 Praeludium - Thomas Oldfield
 In Nomine - William Blitheman (see John Blitheman)
 Fantasia - Nicholas Strogers
 Alman - Nicholas Strogers
 Toccata - Giovanni Picchi
 Praeludium, Toccata - Jan Pieterszoon Sweelinck
 Pavana - Thomas Warrock (see also organists of Hereford Cathedral)
 Galiarda - Thomas Warrock
 Praeludium - Galeazzo
 Heavene and Erthe - Fre - Francis Tregian
 Felix namque 1 - Thomas Tallis
 Felix namque 2 - Thomas Tallis
 Felix namque: Alleluia (possibly a Thomas Tallis sketch); in Breitkopf, it has no title; elsewhere, it is called 'Præludium'.
 Ut, Re, Mi, Fa, Sol, La a 4 voci - Jan Pieterszoon Sweelinck
 Pavana Lachrymae - John Dowland (set by William Byrd)
 Galiarda - James Harding (set by William Byrd)
 In Nomine - John Parsons
 Psalme - Jan Pieterszoon Sweelinck
 Nobodyes Gigge - Richard Farnaby (son of Giles Farnaby)
 Pipers Pavan - Martin Peerson
 Allemanda - Marchant
 Fayne would I Wedd - Richard Farnaby
 Almand - William Tisdall
 Pavana Chromatica - William Tisdall
 Fantasia - Jan Pieterzoon Sweelinck
 Pavana, Clement Cotton - William Tisdall
 Pavana - William Tisdall
 Alman - Hooper (perhaps Edmund Hooper)
 Corranto - Hooper
 Jhonsons Medley - Edward Johnson
 A Galiarde Grownde - William Inglott (organist at Hereford and Norwich Cathedrals)
 The Leaves bee greene - William Inglott
 Galiarda - Jehan Oystermayre
 The Primerose - Martin Peerson
 The Fall of the Leafe - Martin Peerson
 Pavana Delight - Edward Johnson (set by William Byrd)
 Lachrymae Pavan - John Dowland (set by Giles Farnaby)
 Pavana - Orlando Gibbons
 Galiarda - William Tisdall
 Hanskin - Richard Farnaby

See also

 The Mulliner Book
 The Dublin Virginal Manuscript
 My Ladye Nevells Booke
 Susanne van Soldt Manuscript
 Clement Matchett's Virginal Book
 Parthenia
 Priscilla Bunbury's Virginal Book
 Elizabeth Rogers' Virginal Book
 Anne Cromwell's Virginal Book
 Francis Tregian the Younger

References

Further reading
 Jon Baxendale and Francis Knights, ed., The Fitzwilliam Virginal Book (3 vols., Lyrebird Music, Tynset, 2020). [This contains a substantial preface covering background, bibliographical information and detailed notes on performance practice.]
J.A. Fuller Maitland and W. Barclay Squire, ed., The Fitzwilliam Virginal Book (2 vols., Leipzig 1899; repub. New York 1963; rev. edn, 1979)
 Gustave Reese, Music in the Renaissance.  New York, W.W. Norton & Co., 1954.  
 The New Harvard Dictionary of Music, ed. Don Randel.  Cambridge, Massachusetts, Harvard University Press, 1986.  
 
 Percy A. Scholes, The Oxford Companion to Music.  London, Oxford University Press, 1970.  No ISBN.
 Harold Gleason and Warren Becker, Music in the Middle Ages and Renaissance (Music Literature Outlines Series I).  Bloomington, Indiana.
 Ruby Reid Thompson, Francis Tregian the Younger as music copyist: A legend and an alternative view. Music and Letters 2001 82: 1-31;

External links

 
 Fitzwilliam Virginal Book, c.1610 – c.1625, information by the Fitzwilliam Museum
 Lynda Sayce and Kah-Ming Ng: The Fitzwilliam Virginal Book, Signum Records, 1999
 
 Greg Holt: Who wrote the Fitzwilliam Book?

Recordings
 Complete Recording performed on digital piano/harpsichord by Claudio Colombo
 FitzWilliam Virginal Book, Vol. I, recorded by Dutch harpsichordist Pieter-Jan Belder on Brilliant Classics (total is 15 CDs in 7 Volumes, 2011–2020)

 
English music
Renaissance music
Compositions for harpsichord
Compositions for keyboard
Renaissance music manuscript sources
Manuscripts of the Fitzwilliam Museum
Musical manuscripts of the Fitzwilliam Museum